The Haddenham Cabin, located in Fossil Butte National Monument near Kemmerer, Wyoming, is a historic cabin that is listed on the National Register of Historic Places (NRHP).

It is an A-frame cabin that was designed and built c. 1918 by David C. Haddenham.  It is notable for association with fossil quarrying in the Green River Formation;  from seasonal work at this site Haddenham provided specimens of rare fossils to universities, museums, and private collectors.  Located on the Quarry Trail, a 2.5 mile trail to Fossil Butte, once the center of a prehistoric lake; the cabin is about 2000 feet east of the fossil quarry.

It was listed on the NRHP in 2003.  A photo accompanying its NRHP nomination shows an adjacent historic marker describing it as a fossil hunter's home.

References 

Houses on the National Register of Historic Places in Wyoming
Houses completed in 1918
Houses in Lincoln County, Wyoming
National Register of Historic Places in Lincoln County, Wyoming